Delmar is a town in Wicomico County, Maryland, United States. The population was 3,003 at the 2010 census. It is included in the Salisbury, Maryland-Delaware Metropolitan Statistical Area.  When the population is added to Delmar, Delaware, the town's total population is 4,600.

History 

The Town of Delmar was founded in October 1859 with the extension of the Delaware Railroad to the southern boundary of Delaware. The Transpeninsular Line was responsible for the founding of this unique bi-state town because the Charter of the Delaware Railroad Company permitted only the building of a railroad within the State of Delaware and the charter of the corresponding railroad company in Maryland permitted only the laying of railroad track within the State of Maryland. Thus, in 1859, the two respective railroads met and the Town of Delmar was born. The name of Delmar was derived for this railroad center from the states whose line it straddles – DELaware and MARyland.

The Town of Delmar grew slowly until 1884 when the New York, Philadelphia and Norfolk Railroad Co. completed a railroad from Pocomoke City, Maryland to Cape Charles, Virginia and also established a ferry service across the Chesapeake Bay between Cape Charles and Norfolk, Virginia. These new developments immediately made the Delmarva Peninsula an important link between the north and south. The Town of Delmar, being the midway town of the Delmarva Peninsula and already a railroad terminal, was the point for trains to change crews and locomotives and also a center for maintenance of the rolling equipment. As a result of these developments, a tremendous influx of experienced railroad men into the community and considerable extra employment was furnished for local townspeople. During this accelerated rapid growth period, Delmar became a "boom town". New dwelling units sprang up all over town and new businesses were established to meet the demands of its growing population. By 1889, the population of the Town of Delmar had increased to 680 and was still growing.

In 1888, the Town of Delmar, Maryland was granted a charter by the General Assembly of Maryland. An examination of this charter and the laws of Maryland fails to reveal any mention of the twin town of Delmar, Delaware. Therefore, it could be assumed that up until this time there was very little cooperation between halves of the Town of Delmar. The Town of Delmar was almost entirely destroyed by fire in 1892 and again in 1901. The first fire destroyed everything in its path over a ten-acre (40,000 m2) area and the second major fire was almost as destructive. In each instance, the Town of Delmar was rebuilt and continued as a flourishing town. The first indication of any cooperation between Delmar, Maryland and Delmar, Delaware came in 1924 when surveys were conducted for a possible sewerage system for the entire Town of Delmar. The construction of the sewerage system in 1927 was considered the first joint project between the two towns in that the law provided that both towns would maintain the outfall sewer with Maryland paying the expenses and billing the Delaware side one-half of all costs.

The biggest push towards abolishing the jurisdictional, legal effects of the State line came when the Lions Club voted to sponsor a project for the consolidation of the two school systems in the town. Since the town was founded, each side had its own individual school with the one in Delaware operating under the local School Board and the Maryland School operating under the Wicomico County Board of Education. This very controversial issue was bitterly contested for over three years and finally in 1949, this dream became a reality when the junior and senior high schools were consolidated into one school using the Delaware facilities. Four years later the fourth, fifth and sixth grades were also consolidated with classes in the Maryland school. This controversial decision represented one of the greatest steps forward educationally for the town of Delmar and also towards eliminating the jurisdictional barrier between the two parts of town.

Geography 

Delmar is located at  (38.4509, −75.5695).

Demographics 

The median income for a household in the town was $28,462, and the median income for a family was $31,991. Males had a median income of $29,643 versus $20,885 for females. The per capita income for the town was $13,821. About 16.9% of families and 16.9% of the population were below the poverty line, including 23.2% of those under age 18 and 18.7% of those age 65 or over.

2010 census
As of the census of 2010, there were 3,003 people, 1,162 households, and 742 families residing in the town. The racial makeup of the town was 68.2% White, 21.3% African American, 0.3% Native American, 5.5% Asian, 1.6% from other races, and 3.1% from two or more races. Hispanic or Latino of any race were 4.6% of the population.

There were 1,162 households, of which 40.0% had children under the age of 18 living with them, 37.0% were married couples living together, 20.1% had a female householder with no husband present, 6.8% had a male householder with no wife present, and 36.1% were non-families. 27.1% of all households were made up of individuals, and 5.9% had someone living alone who was 65 years of age or older. The average household size was 2.58 and the average family size was 3.11.

The median age in the town was 30.5 years. 27.8% of residents were under the age of 18; 12.1% were between the ages of 18 and 24; 29.4% were from 25 to 44; 22.7% were from 45 to 64; and 8.2% were 65 years of age or older. The gender makeup of the town was 45.7% male and 54.3% female.

Education 
Wicomico County Public Schools operates Delmar Elementary School. It opened in 1920 and was a grade 7-12 school in 1923 but later became the elementary school. The original building consists of the main office and the second floor, with other parts of the first floor being further expansions. It was previously known as Maryland Elementary School.

Students on the Maryland side may go to public school in the Delmar School District in Delaware, which operates Delmar Middle School and Delmar Senior High School. Residents of Delmar, Maryland may attend the Delmar, Delaware schools or they may attend Wicomico Middle School.

Notable people
 Lewis J. Fields, United States Marine Corps Lieutenant general
 Elihu Emory Jackson – Governor of Maryland (1888–1892)
 Edward L. Fike (1920-2011), journalist and publisher in California, Montana, North Carolina, Ohio, and Virginia.

Trivia 

Delmar was one of the filming locations for the 1986 horror movie Redneck Zombies.

See also

 Twin cities (geographical proximity)
 Delmar, Delaware

References

External links

 Towns of Delmar, Delaware and Maryland
 Greater Delmar Chamber of Commerce
 

Towns in Maryland
Towns in Wicomico County, Maryland
Salisbury metropolitan area
Populated places established in 1859
1859 establishments in Maryland